This is a list of people have won multiple Academy Awards in a single year in the standard competitive categories.  To date, a total of 86 individuals have achieved this feat on 99 distinct occasions with the multiple winners having won more than one awards that year.  The most awards have been won by Walt Disney, who won four Academy Awards in 1954. Of these, ten individuals have achieved this feat on more than one occasion.  This list is current as of the 95th Academy Awards ceremony held on March 12, 2023.

List of winners

Notes

Superlatives 
 Ceremony with Most Multiple Winners: The 23rd Academy Awards ceremony for 1950 produced five multiple Academy Award winners.
 Consecutive Multiple Award Winners: Gordon Hollingshead (1945 and 1946), Joseph L. Mankiewicz (1949 and 1950), and Alan Menken (1991 and 1992) were the only individuals to win multiple Academy Awards in consecutive years.
 Female Multiple Award Winners: Kathryn Bigelow, Edith Head, Catherine Martin, Frances McDormand, Fran Walsh, and Chloé Zhao were the only females to win multiple Academy Awards in the same year.
 Films with Most Multiple Winners: Samson and Delilah (1950) and The Lord of the Rings: The Return of the King (2003) each produced four multiple Academy Award winners.
 First Multiple Award Winners: Pierre Collings and Sheridan Gibney were the first individuals ever to win multiple Academy Awards in the same year; they each received two awards at the 9th Academy Awards ceremony for 1936.
 Longest Time Span Between Multiple Awards: Billy Wilder won multiple Academy Awards for 1945 and for 1960, a time span of 15 years.
 Most Awards in One Year: Walt Disney holds the record for the most Academy Awards won by an individual at a single ceremony with four awards at the 26th Academy Awards ceremony for 1953. Walt Disney also holds the record for winning for the most different films in one year (four); no one else has won awards in the same year for more than two films.
 Most Multiple Awards: Alan Menken won multiple awards at four Academy Awards ceremonies; he won multiple awards for 1989, 1991, 1992, and 1995.

Statistics 

 Awards Ceremonies: To date, there have been 94 annual awards ceremonies; 56 ceremonies produced 98 multiple award winners, while 37 ceremonies produced no multiple award winners.
 1 ceremony produced 5 multiple award winners (23rd Academy Awards)
 2 ceremonies produced 4 multiple award winners (76th and 91st Academy Awards)
 9 ceremonies produced 3 multiple award winners
 14 ceremonies produced 2 multiple award winners
 30 ceremonies produced 1 multiple award winner
 38 ceremonies produced 0 multiple award winners
 Individual Winners: To date, 82 individuals have won multiple awards in a single year; 11 individuals did so one more than one occasion, while 73 individuals did so on one occasion.
 1 individual won multiple awards 4 times (Alan Menken)
 1 individual won multiple awards 3 times (Gary Rydstrom)
 9 individuals won multiple awards 2 times
 73 individuals won multiple awards 1 time
 Multiple Awards:  To date, there have been 96 occasions on which individuals won multiple awards in a single year; these occasions produced a total of 205 awards.
 on 1 occasion, an individual won 4 awards in a single year (Walt Disney, 26th Academy Awards)
 on 13 occasions, individuals won 3 awards in a single year
 on 86 occasions, individuals won 2 awards in a single year

References

Multiple